George Arthur Reihner (April 27, 1955 – March 11, 2021) was a former professional American football player who played Guard for four seasons for the Houston Oilers.
He was the chosen in the 2nd Round of the 1977 NFL Draft (38th pick overall), after a successful playing career at Penn State. A three-year starter at guard for coach Joe Paterno's offense, Reihner played in four bowl games (Orange, Cotton, Sugar, Gator) as well as in the Senior Bowl. Prior to the 1976 season, Reihner was named team captain for the Nittany Lions. In 1975 and 1976, he was named 1st Team, All East. In 1976 Reihner received 2nd Team All-Honors.  Reihner graduated from Washington High School, Washington, PA in 1973. In his senior year, Reihner played an influential part in the Prexies football team reaching the WPIAL Class AA Semi-Finals. His post-season honors included being named All-State, voted WPIAL Most Valuable Lineman, and named captain of the Big 33 Pennsylvania team which beat the Ohio All-Stars, 21–19.

NFL career 
Reihner played in 13 games his rookie season and was named the American Football Conference Offensive Rookie of the Year. He also make the NFL's All-Rookie team. In 1979, Reihner was part of the Houston offensive line to win the league's Outstanding Offensivel Line award. The Oilers line became the first NFL unit in the same season to produce the league's leading rusher (Earl Campbell) and giving up the fewest quarterback sacks (12).  A back injury cut Reihner's professional career short, retiring after the 1982 season. He played in a total of 27 games for the Oilers.

Post-NFL 
In 1984, Reihner graduated from Dickinson School of Law, working as a Pennsylvania Superior Court law clerk. He later became a prominent lawyer in Scranton.

1955 births
2021 deaths
Players of American football from Pittsburgh
American football offensive guards
Penn State Nittany Lions football players
Houston Oilers players